Texas Health Presbyterian Hospital Denton (formerly Denton Community Hospital and Presbyterian Hospital of Denton) is a hospital in North Texas and southern Oklahoma. With over 890 employees and a medical staff of more than 300, the  hospital is licensed for 255 beds, and is accredited by the Joint Commission on Accreditation of Health Care Organizations (JCAHO).

Services 
Texas Health Presbyterian Hospital Denton is home to a Women's Imaging Center, The Center for Women. This facility includes 11 Labor, Delivery & Recovery Suites, 26 private postpartum rooms; a 20-bed nursery, and a Level III 10-bed Neonatal Intensive Care Unit. The Center for Women is a certified Softer Mammogram Provider, that includes mammography, bone densitometry, ultrasound, and a stereotactic breast biopsy suite.

References

External links 
Official Website
Texas Health Resources

Hospitals in Denton, Texas
Hospitals established in 1987
1987 establishments in Texas